Međimurje may refer to:

Međimurje (region), a small historical and geographical region in the northernmost part of Croatia
Međimurje County, a triangle-shaped county in Northern Croatia
NK Međimurje, a Croatian football club based in Čakovec
Međimurje horse, an autochthonous medium-heavy horse breed of draught horse originating from Međimurje